Ruth Easterling may refer to:
 Ruth M. Easterling, member of the North Carolina House of Representatives
 Ruth Marguerite Easterling, American pathologist